K. Rajendran, popularly known as Viduthalai Rajendran is a periyarist, currently the General Secretary of Dravidar Viduthalai Kazhagam, formerly Periyar Dravidar Kazhagam. He is well known for propagating the principles of Periyar E. V. Ramasamy through his literary works. He is the founder and editor-in-chief of the weekly Puratchi Periyar Muzhakkam.

Personal life
Rajendran was born on 16 October 1947, to Kandhasamy and Dhanam in Mayiladuthurai, Thanjavur district, Tamil Nadu. During World War II, his father joined the Indian National Army. He was incarcerated for participating in the protest held by Ma.Po.Sivagnanam, the founder of Tamil Arasu Kazhagam, insisting the Government to merge some border areas with the Madras state.

Education
He completed his schooling in Mayiladuthurai Municipal school. He did his Pre-university course in A. V. C. College, Mayiladuthurai. In 1969, he received his bachelor's degree in Physics from the same college.

Marriage
In 1976, he was introduced to Saraswathy, M.A., M.Phil., a lecturer at Queen Mary College by his friend. As she was an ardent periyarist and a feminist, friendship bloomed between them. He started sharing his life with her from 10.01.1979. Their wedding ceremony, which took place at a library in Periyar Thidal, Vepery, Chennai, was made as simple as possible according to the principles of Periyar. The event was presided by K.Veeramani, General Secretary of Dravidar Kazhagam. It was recorded in Viduthalai, a daily founded by Periyar. They decided not to have children and have lived with the policy "Public Life is Our Life" till today.

Public life

Dravidar Kazhagam
As a lot of social oppression prevailed in Kenikarai, a village in Mayiladuthurai, there were umpteen Periyarists there. He learned of Periyarism through his brother who was guided by O. Arangasamy, a Periyarist. When he was in class IX, he started reading Viduthalai, a daily founded by Periyar which taught him the principles of Periyar.

In 1969, he joined the youth wing of Dravidar Kazhagam in Mayiladuthurai and conducted many events with regard to Periyarism such as, Manthirama? Thanthirama?[Tamil:மந்திரமா? தந்திரமா?] and public meetings. He started to speak and write a lot about the principles of Periyar. He called Periyar and organized a public meeting and a seminar at Mayiladuthurai. In 1970, K.Veeramani popularly known as Aasiriyar, currently the President of Dravidar Kazhagam called him to Viduthalai office. In 1971, he involved in the distribution work of Unmai, a bi-monthly founded by Periyar. He wrote his first article criticizing Tirukkuṛaḷ, in Viduthalai. Aasiriyar encouraged him to continue his writing and asked him to publish the same article in Unmai too. He began writing with the pen name Gangaikondan[Tamil:கங்கைகொண்டான்], suggested by K.Veeramani. His article titled Minvetta? Moolaivetta?[Tamil: மின்வெட்டா? மூளைவெட்டா?] was the first one which was published with the previously stated pen name. He became the editor-in-charge of Viduthalai in 1972. He did many translations too. When K.Veeramani was arrested under Maintenance of Internal Security Act in 1976, Public Information Bureau censored the contents of Viduthalai too. Though, many of his articles were censored, he continued writing. In 1980, K.Veeramani asked him to serve as the Secretary of Pagutharivaalar Kazhagam[Tamil: பகுத்தறிவாளர் கழகம்], but he declined. Anyway, he was made the secretary of Pagutharivu Ezhuthaalar Mandram[Tamil:பகுத்தறிவு எழுத்தாளர் மன்றம்]. He was also a member in the advisory committee of Periyar Trust. He started writing editorial in Viduthalai from 1978. In 1983, he organized an cultural forum which addressed the issues regarding Tamil Eelam and was very useful for the DK movement too. He scripted and performed many plays among which Kazhudhaikku theriyum karpoora vaasanai[கழுதைக்குத் தெரியும் கற்பூர வாசனை] and Sangiliyan [Tamil:சங்கிலியன்] were the popular ones. He became the editor-in-charge of Unmai in 1987. In 1996, he left Dravidar Kazhagam.

Periyar Dravidar Kazhagam
In 1996, he started a movement named Periyar Dravidar Kazhagam and became the General Secretary for the same. He founded Periyar Murasu, a four-page magazine for the movement. He was the editor of that magazine. He changed the name of the magazine to Puratchi Periyar Muzhakkam in 1997. The movement fought for the uplifting of Dalits and for the rights of Muslims too. Many Dalit movements joined hands with PDK. He became the coordinator of The Federation for recovering social justice[Tamil: சமூக நீதி மீட்பு கூட்டமைப்பு]. PDK did much groundwork for the abolition of the death penalty.

Thanthai Periyar Dravidar Kazhagam
The team of supporters who left Dravidar Kazhagam along with Kolathur Mani and the two movements namely, Periyar Dravidar Kazhagam and Taminadu Dravidar Kazhagam led by Thiruvaarur Thangarasu merged and started functioning in the name of "Thanthai Periyar Dravidar Kazhagam". His magazine, Puratchi Periyar Muzhakkam was published as a weekly from 14 January 2001. A merger conference was held on 11 August 2001 in Chennai. Thanthai Periyar Dravidar Kazhagam was later renamed as Periyar Dravidar Kazhagam. He became the General Secretary of that movement.

Dravidar Viduthalai Kazhagam
Some differences of opinion among the members led to the dissolution of the Periyar Dravidar Kazhagam. The dissolution was done on one condition that none should use the name "Periyar Dravidar Kazhagam". He started functioning as the General Secretary of the movement, Dravidar Viduthalai Kazhagam led by Kolathur Mani from 12 August 2012. The ultimate goal of the movement is to propagate different aspects of Periyarism viz. eradication of caste, women liberation, rationalism, communism, independent Tamil Nadu and bring out a communist society without caste and gender inequalities which Periyar dreamt of! The slogan of the movement is, "Let us defeat the cultural oppression of Brahmins, political domination of the Indian Nationalists and economic exploitation of the Multinationals". He is functioning as the General Secretary of this movement till today.

Current positions
 General Secretary, Dravidar Viduthalai Kazhagam
 Editor, Puratchi Periyar Muzhakkam

Books
 Indira aatchiyin kodumaigal - MISA [Tamil:இந்திரா ஆட்சியின் கொடுமைகள் - மிசா]
 Pangu Markettum Parpanargalum [Tamil:பங்கு மார்க்கெட்டும் பார்ப்பனர்களும்]
 RSS oor abaayam [Tamil:ஆர்.எஸ்.எஸ். ஓர் அபாயம்]
 Sangh Parivarkalin sathi varalaaru [Tamil:சங் பரிவார்களின் சதி வரலாறு]
 Oppandhangalai Seerkulaithathu yaar? [Tamil:ஒப்பந்தங்களை சீர்குலைத்தது யார்?]
 Puligal meethaana avadhoorukku maruppu [Tamil:புலிகள் மீதான அவதூறுக்கு மறுப்பு]
 Veerasavarkaar yaar? [Tamil:வீரசவர்க்கார் யார்?]
 1991-il Rajiv kolayil maraikkapatta unmaigal [Tamil:1991- இராஜீவ் கொலையில் மறைக்கப்பட்ட உண்மைகள்]
 Rajiv kolayil pathungi nirkum saamigal[Tamil:இராஜீவ் கொலையில் பதுங்கி நிற்கும் சாமிகள்]. More information has been added to it and is now available with the title Arasiyal Tharagar Subramania Samy [Tamil:அரசியல் தரகர் சுப்பிரமணிய சாமி]
 India vilai pokirathu [Tamil:இந்தியா விலைபோகிறது], a compilation of his speech.
 Periyaarai kochaipaduthum kuzhapavaathigal [Tamil:பெரியாரைக் கொச்சைப்படுத்தும் குழப்பவாதிகள்]

Other works

 He has written multifarious articles in various newspapers.

References

1947 births
Living people
Periyarists